SMS G11 was a V1-class large torpedo boat of the Imperial German Navy. She was built by the Germaniawerft shipyard at Kiel between 1911 and 1912, completing on 8 August 1912.

G11 served through the First World War, taking part in the Battle of Heligoland Bight in 1914, the Battle of Dogger Bank in 1915 and the Battle of Jutland in 1916. Following the end of the war, the ship continued to serve with the Weimar Republic's Reichsmarine and Nazi Germany's Kriegsmarine. In 1936, G11 became a training vessel, and in 1939 was renamed T111. She was wrecked during an air raid on Kiel on 3 April 1945 and later scuttled.

Design and construction
In the first decade of the 20th century, the Imperial German Navy had generally ordered twelve large torpedo boats (Große Torpedoboote) as part of each year's construction programme, with a gradual evolution of design in each year's orders, with speed, range and seaworthiness improving year-on-year. These changes resulted in the ships becoming larger, and concerns grew that the torpedo boats were becoming too big to manoeuvre in and out of the battle fleet. For the 1911 fiscal year's orders, it was decided to revert to a smaller design, with the numbering system for torpedo boats restarting as a consequence. As was normal practice, that year's order was split between two shipyards, with six (V1–V6) to be built by AG Vulcan and six (G7–G12) by Germaniawerft, with detailed design differing between the two shipyards.

Displacement was  design and  full load.

The ship was armed with two 8.8 cm SK L/30 naval guns, (replaced by 8.8 cm SK L/45 naval guns in 1916), one on the forecastle and one aft. Four single 50 cm (19.7 in) torpedo tubes were fitted, with two on the ship's beam in the gap between the forecastle and the ship's bridge which were capable of firing straight ahead, and two on the ship's centreline aft of the funnels. 18 mines could be carried. The ship had a crew of 74 officers and men.

G11 was laid down at Germaniawerft's Kiel shipyard as yard number 174, was launched on 23 April 1912 and completed on 8 August 1912.

Modifications
In 1916, G11 had her guns replaced by 8.8 cm SK L/45 naval guns. In 1921 the 8.8 cm guns were replaced by two 10.5 cm L/45 guns and the ship's forecastle lengthened. From 1928 to 1931, the remaining Germaniawerft-built ships of the class (i.e. Displacement increased to  design and  full load. On conversion to a training role from 1936, the ship's forward gun was removed and her bridge enlarged. By 1944, armament was a single 10.5 cm gun mounted aft, with two 20 mm anti-aircraft guns.

Service
On commissioning, G11 joined the 10th Half-flotilla of the 5th Torpedo boat flotilla, and remained in that flotilla in April 1914.

First World War
G11 was still a member of the 10th Half-flotilla of the 5th Torpedo boat flotilla of the German High Seas Fleet on the outbreak of war. On 28 August 1914, the British Harwich Force, supported by light cruisers and battlecruisers of the Grand Fleet, carried out a raid towards Heligoland with the intention of destroying patrolling German torpedo boats. The 5th Torpedo boat flotilla, together with four German light cruisers, waited near Heligoland in support. The 5th Torpedo Boat Flotilla, including G11, were sent out from Heligoland to investigate sightings of British submarines, and ran into several British destroyers. The Flotilla then turned away to try and escape the trap, but the torpedo boat , which along with  could not make full speed and lagged behind the rest of the flotilla, was hit by British shells before the arrival of the German cruiser  allowed the 5th Flotilla to escape. The torpedo boat  of the outer screen did not manage to evade the British force and was sunk. G11 was undamaged.

On 23 January 1915, a German force of Battlecruisers and light cruisers, escorted by torpedo boats, and commanded by Admiral Franz von Hipper, made a sortie to attack British fishing boats on the Dogger Bank. G11, part of the 10th Half-Flotilla, formed part of the escort for Hipper's force. British Naval Intelligence was warned of the raid by radio messages decoded by Room 40, and sent out the Battlecruiser Force from Rosyth, commanded by Admiral Beatty aboard  and the Harwich Force of light cruisers and destroyers, to intercept the German force. The British and German Forces met on the morning of 24 January in the Battle of Dogger Bank. On sighting the British, Hipper ordered his ships to head south-east to escape the British, who set off in pursuit. The armoured cruiser  was disabled by British shells and was sunk, but the rest of the German force escaped, with the German battlecruiser  and the British battlecruiser  badly damaged.

In August 1915 the Germans detached a large portion of the High Seas Fleet for operations in the Gulf of Riga in support of the advance of German troops. It was planned to enter the Gulf via the Irben Strait, defeating any Russian naval forces and mining the entrance to Moon Sound. The deployed forces included the 5th Torpedo Boat flotilla. On 10 August, while the battlecruiser  and cruiser  bombarded Utö island, G11 reported spotting the periscope of a submarine, one of several reported submarine sightings that caused the day's bombardment to be abandoned.

G11 was the leader of the 5th Torpedo Boat Flotilla at the Battle of Jutland on 31 May – 1 June 1916. The 5th Flotilla supported the main force of the German High Seas Fleet. From about 20:15 CET, the German torpedo boat flotillas launched a series of torpedo attacks against the British battle line in order to cover the German fleet's turn away from the British. First to attack were the 6th and 9th Flotillas, followed by the 3rd Flotilla. At 20:38, the 5th Flotilla started an attack run, but it was unable to find the British battleline due to poor visibility caused by fog and smoke, and the attack was aborted. G11 was undamaged.

By late April 1917, the torpedo boats of the 5th Torpedo Boat Flotilla had been fitted for minesweeping and their crews trained in that task, and became increasingly dedicated to minesweeping. G11 remained leader of the 5th Torpedo Boat Flotilla at the end of the War in November 1918.

Postwar operations
G11 survived the war, and was one of the twelve destroyers that the Reichsmarine was allowed to retain under the Treaty of Versailles. She was modernised in the late 1920s, and was retained in active service after the entry into service of the new Type 23 and Type 24 torpedo boats allowed many of the older boats to be retired or moved to subsidiary duties. In 1932, she was part of the 1st Half-flotilla of the 1st Torpedo Boat Flotilla. G11 remained in service when the Reichsmarine became the Kriegsmarine following the Nazi seizure of power in 1933. She was still part of the active torpedo boat flotillas in 1935.

G11 became a training ship in 1936, and was employed as a tender in a torpedo school. On 23 April 1939, the ship was renamed T111, to free up G11 for a planned class of escort ships.

T111 remained in use in training duties through the Second World War, until she was wrecked by bombs during an air raid at Kiel on 3 April 1945. The wreck was scuttled by the British on 14 December that year.

Notes

References

Bibliography
 
 
 
 
 
 
 
 
 
 
 
 
 
 
 

Torpedo boats of the Imperial German Navy
World War I torpedo boats of Germany
Ships built in Kiel
1912 ships